Angela K. Wilson is an American scientist and former (2022) President of the American Chemical Society.  She currently serves as the John A. Hannah Distinguished Professor of Chemistry, Associate Dean for Strategic Initiatives in the College of Natural Sciences,  and Director of the MSU Center for Quantum Computing, Science, and Engineering (MSU-Q) at Michigan State University.

Education and influences
Wilson received her Bachelor of Science (BS) degree from Eastern Washington University and her Ph.D. from the University of Minnesota. She was a post-doctoral fellow at Pacific Northwest National Laboratory in the Environmental Molecular Sciences Laboratory (EMSL).  She worked on an MBA at the University of Oklahoma, and continued to build up her leadership training via the Harvard Institute for Management & Leadership in Education (MLE) program, Leadership Texas, and other programs.   Some of her early influences were via the Girl Scouts, where she earned a Gold Award, the highest award in Girl Scouts.

Career

Academic chemist 
As a researcher,  Wilson's work spans physical, theoretical, and computational chemistry.  She is engaged in areas including quantum mechanical and quantum dynamical method development, thermochemical and spectroscopic studies of small molecules, protein modeling and drug design, catalysis design, environmental challenges (i.e., CO2, PFAS), heavy element and transition metal chemistry, and mechanical properties of materials.   Some of her computational chemistry methodologies, including ab initio correlation consistent basis sets, correlation consistent composite approach (ccCA), complete basis set (CBS) procedures, and multireference wavefunction diagnostics for transition metals are utilized worldwide.  Her recent work on PFAS has provided insight upon the impact of these species on human health and potential mitigation strategies in the environment, including soils.  For drug design, she has been engaged in the development of strategies for a variety of anti-inflammatory diseases, end-stage kidney function, and tuberculosis.

She was named one of the top five most influential women chemists and top 40 most influential women in STEM in the world during 2010-2020.

Academic and professional appointments 
Wilson currently serves as the John A. Hannah Distinguished Professor of Chemistry, Associate Dean for Strategic Initiatives in the College of Natural Sciences,  and Director of the MSU Center for Quantum Computing, Science, and Engineering (MSU-Q) at Michigan State University.  From 2016-2018, she was Division Director of the Division of Chemistry at the National Science Foundation (NSF), heading the division from 2016 to 2018, where she led the direction of investments in chemistry research across the nation for NSF.  Prior to this, she was at the University of North Texas, where she was a Regents Professor, and director of the Center for Advanced Scientific Computing and Modeling (CASCaM). She also served as Associate Vice Provost for Faculty and led the Office of Faculty Success at the University of North Texas (UNT), working with ~2,400 faculty and ~58 department chairs, after serving for two years as a faculty fellow in the UNT Office of the Provost.

Professional societies and activities 
Wilson has held leadership roles in several scientific societies. In 2022, she was President of the American Chemical Society (ACS), one of the world's largest scientific societies, with over 170,000 members and an annual operating budget of nearly $700M, with two major business operations.  From 2021-2023, she is a member of the ACS Board of Directors.  She has served on the Leadership Bureau of the International Union of Pure and Applied Chemistry (IUPAC), as well as President of IUPAC Division I, the Division of Physical and Biophysical Chemistry.   She was the elected Chair of the Chemistry Section of the American Association for the Advancement of Science (AAAS).  For the U.S. National Academies, she served as the Chair of the U.S. National Committee for IUPAC, and has served on the U.S. Delegation to the IUPAC General Assembly on five occasions, chairing the delegation twice.  In 2018, she chaired the Gordon Conference on Computational Chemistry.

She has served on numerous scientific boards and committees.  Wilson is a member of the editorial board for Scientific Reports and the editorial advisory board for Cell Reports Physical Science, and has served as an editor of Computational and Theoretical Chemistry and as a member of the editorial advisory boards for the Journal of Physical Chemistry and International Journal of Quantum Chemistry.

She has edited six books, including Pioneers of Quantum Chemistry.

Wilson is a frequent speaker on national and global science policy, as well as on her research, success in science, leadership, and many other topics.  She has given over 500 invited talks.

Awards and honors 
Some of her recognitions include:
 NSF CAREER Award, 2003 
 Distinguished Women in Chemistry or Chemical Engineering, International Union of Pure and Applied Chemistry, 2013
 Francis P. Garvan-John M. Olin Medal, 2015
 Michigan Women's Hall of Fame, 2018
 Iota Sigma Pi National Honorary Member, 2023
She is a Fellow of the American Chemical Society (2010), American Association for the Advancement of Science (2012), and the American Physical Society (2013).

Publications

References

Living people
21st-century American chemists
Fellows of the American Chemical Society
Fellows of the American Physical Society
University of Minnesota alumni
Michigan State University faculty
American women chemists
Computational chemists
Year of birth missing (living people)
Oklahoma Baptist University faculty
American women academics
21st-century American women scientists